Manuel Rodríguez Barros (13 August 1926 – 20 October 1997) was a Spanish racing cyclist. He rode in the 1951 Tour de France.

References

External links
 

1926 births
1997 deaths
Spanish male cyclists
Place of birth missing
People from Ponteareas
Sportspeople from the Province of Pontevedra
Cyclists from Galicia (Spain)